Oders Dell Wilson Jr. (September 12, 1954 – October 29, 1991) was an American world champion powerlifter and world champion strongman competitor.

Strongman/Powerlifting 
"O.D." Wilson came very close to being the first American since Bill Kazmaier to win the World's Strongest Man title in 1990. Leading the competition with a comfortable 5½ points before the last event - an unprecedented 200 m race with a 100 kg weight on the back - the very heavy 400 lb Wilson lacked the endurance and running speed to complete the course quickly and ended up losing by just half a point to the much lighter Jón Páll Sigmarsson in the overall competition. Wilson vowed to win the 1991 World's Strongest Man title, but a back injury sustained just before the competition, a prolapsed disc, hampered his performance and he finished in fifth place. Wilson was known by the nickname "Nightmare", as he was an incredibly massive man, but he was known for his genial character and big heart.

Wilson spent 12 years in the military, eight of which were spent overseas in Germany, Japan, and Korea. Prior to putting on weight, Wilson was a 200 m track athlete, a basketball player, boxed for two years in the Army, and was an avid racquetball player. When Wilson was not competing, he was a security guard and a bodyguard to various celebrities, including Michael and Janet Jackson.

Wilson was a very successful powerlifter, rising to fame in the mid-1980s. He was a five-time U.S. Services champion and a five-time U.S. Army titleholder. Wilson won the 1988 USPF National Super Heavyweight Powerlifting title, as well as the 1988 IPF World Powerlifting Championships. Some of Wilson's training partners were also notable World's Strongest Man competitors including Rick "Grizzly" Brown, Bill Kazmaier and James Perry, who competed in the 1992 World's Strongest Man.

Wilson set multiple world records throughout his career; at the 1989 Armed Forces Championships, O.D. Wilson squatted , benched , and deadlifted  for a then, all-time total record of 2430 pounds. It is believed that he had one of the biggest ever quadriceps, measuring a phenomenal 42 inches. Wilson's shoe size was 23 and his ring size was 26, while the ring size for the average adult male is between 10 and 12. Wilson also appeared in a 1989 science fiction action film Cyborg featuring Jean-Claude Van Damme. He is considered by many to be the strongest man to never win the World's Strongest Man contest, along with Riku Kiri and Derek Poundstone.

Death
On October 29, 1991, while being interviewed on a radio program just a few weeks after the 1991 World's Strongest Man competition, Wilson complained of chest pains and went outside for some fresh air. Within moments, he collapsed and died of cardiac arrest. He was just 37 years old.

Personal Records
Powerlifting
 Squat –  equipped
 Bench Press –  equipped
 Deadlift – 
 Total – 1102.2 kg (454.2/250.4/397.5) / 2430 lbs (1002/552/876.3) equipped (2/16/89 USPF)
→ former all-time world record in super heavyweight class (regardless of weight class)

References

1954 births
1991 deaths
American strength athletes
American powerlifters
People from Winter Haven, Florida
Sportspeople from Winter Haven, Florida